Givak-e Olya (also Romanized as Gīvak-e ‘Olyā, Geyūk ‘Olyā, and Givak Olya; also known as Gīvak-e Bālā) is a village in Baqeran Rural District, in the Central District of Birjand County, South Khorasan Province, Iran. At the 2006 census, its population was 27, in 12 families.

References 

Populated places in Birjand County